The 2001 Lithuania Census was carried out during April 6 - April 16 by the Lithuanian Department of Statistics. The results were published in 2002.

At the period of the census the country was subdivided as follows:
10 counties 
60 municipalities 
106 cities 
464 rural elderships 
21,500 rural settlements 
Total population was 3,483,972, of which 2,332,098 were urban dwellers and 1,151,874 were rural dwellers.

References

2001
2001 censuses
Census